The King's Prisoner is a 1935 German historical comedy film directed by Carl Boese and starring Michael Bohnen, Paul Kemp, and Susi Lanner. It is based around the development of Meissen porcelain during the eighteenth century, particularly the role of the alchemist Johann Friedrich Böttger.

The film's sets were designed by the art director Max Seefelder. It was shot at the Bavaria Studios in Munich.

Cast

See also
Augustus the Strong (1936), another film with Michael Bohnen as King Augustus
The Blue Swords (1949), East German film about Johann Friedrich Böttger

References

External links

1930s historical comedy films
German historical comedy films
Films of Nazi Germany
Films directed by Carl Boese
Films set in the 1700s
Films shot at Bavaria Studios
Bavaria Film films
German black-and-white films
1930s German films
1930s Georgia (U.S. state) elections